A partial solar eclipse occurred on April 3, 1848, during fall.  A solar eclipse occurs when the Moon passes between Earth and the Sun, thereby totally or partly obscuring the image of the Sun for a viewer on Earth. A partial solar eclipse occurs in the polar regions of the Earth when the center of the Moon's shadow misses the Earth.

It was the second of four partial eclipses that took place that year, each two in two months, the last one was on March 5 in the Northern Hemisphere, the next one was in a smaller portion of the same location on August 28, 1848.  It was a solar saros 146 cycle

Description
The eclipse was visible in the Pacific Ocean and included the northeast and northwestern Antarctica especially a part of the west of the Antarctic Peninsula.

The eclipse started at sunrise offshore from Antarctica where the Indian and the Pacific Ocean divide and ended at sunset in the peninsula and offshore from Chile.

It showed about up to 15-30% obscuration in northern Antarctica within the 180th meridian, and from 48% to 58% obscuration in the peninsular portion.

10% obscurity in northern Antarctica and 20% at the Antarctic peninsula.  The greatest eclipse was at the Antarctic Peninsula at 71.8 S, 89 W at 22:49 UTC (4:49 PM local time).

The subsolar marking was north of the 5th parallel north in the Pacific around the Palmyra Atoll.

See also 
 List of solar eclipses in the 19th century

References

External links 
 Google interactive maps
 Solar eclipse data

1848 04 03
Solar eclipse of 04 03
1848 04 03
April 1848 events